The 2016 Men's International Festival of Hockey was a field hockey tournament held in Victoria, Australia. The tournament was held between 23–30 November in the Victorian cities, Melbourne and Bendigo. A total of four teams competed in the tournament.

Australia won the tournament for the first time by defeating New Zealand 3–1 in the final. India won the bronze medal by defeating Malaysia 4–1 in the third and fourth playoff.

All times are local (UTC+10:00).

Participating nations

Results

Melbourne
The first phase of the tournament was a 4 team tournament at the State Netball and Hockey Centre in Melbourne.

Pool matches

Third and fourth place

Final

Bendigo
The second phase of the tournament was a two match test series held at the Bendigo Hockey Complex.

Test Matches

Women's tournament

Melbourne
The women's tournament was a three match test series held at the State Netball and Hockey Centre.

Results

Statistics

Final standings

Melbourne

Bendigo
The Bendigo series finished as a tie, with both teams winning one match as well as scoring and conceding 6 goals each.

References

International Festival of Hockey
International Festival
International Festival
2016 in New Zealand sport
2016 in Indian sport
2016 in Malaysian sport
November 2016 sports events in Australia